Weki Meki (abbreviated as WEME or WKMK) is a South Korean girl group formed by Fantagio in 2017. The group consists of eight members: Suyeon, Elly, Yoojung, Doyeon, Sei, Lua, Rina, and Lucy.

History

Pre-debut
The members started out as trainees under Fantagio i-Teen, a rookie talent development program under Fantagio Entertainment, and were known as i-Teen Girls.

In 2015, i-Teen Girls members Kim Do-yeon, Choi Yoo-jung, Lua, Lucy and Elly (as well as former trainees Chu Ye-jin and Lee Soo-min) had numerous cameos in label mates Astro's predebut online web drama To Be Continued.

Elly (as Jung Hae-rim), Choi Yoo-jung, Kim Do-yeon, and Sei (as Lee Seo-jeong, then under LOUDers Entertainment) competed in the Mnet survival television program Produce 101, which aired from January 22 to April 1, 2016. Choi Yoo-jung and Kim Do-yeon were ranked in the final top 11 contestants and debuted in the project girl group I.O.I.

On July 6, 2017 Fantagio revealed that their new girl group would be called Weki Meki.

2017–2018: Debut with Weme, Lucky, and Kiss, Kicks

Weki Meki released their debut extended play, Weme on August 8, 2017. The EP contains six tracks with the lead single titled "I Don't Like Your Girlfriend". The album also features lyrics written by Choi Yoo-jung. A month later, a limited "B Version" of their debut EP was physically released. In November, according to Gaon Music Chart, the EP sold over 47,000 physical copies since its release and marking the highest selling album by a girl group that debuted in 2017.

On February 1, 2018, a reality show called "Weki Meki, mohae?" premiered on YouTube. The show had a total of 60 episodes, and lasted until April 1, 2018. The show followed the girls on their 60-day campaign to become an all-around idol.

On February 21, 2018, Weki Meki released their second extended play titled Lucky. The album features a total of six songs including lead single "La La La" and "Butterfly", the latter being a remake of an original soundtrack from the 2009 sports film Take Off which the group released in support of the 2018 Winter Olympics.

Weki Meki released their first single album Kiss, Kicks on October 11, 2018. The album features a total of three tracks including lead single "Crush" with rap portions on the album written by member Yoo-jung.

2019–present: Hide and Seek, New Rules and I Am Me.
The group released their second single album Lock End LOL on May 14, including the lead single "Picky Picky".
A repackage version of the single album titled Week End LOL with lead single "Tiki-Taka (99%)" release on August 8.

On February 6, Fantagio Music confirmed that the group will have a comeback with digital single album Dazzle Dazzle on February 20, 2020, and confirmed that member Yoojung will join after her hiatus from October 2019.

On May 29, Fantagio released a teaser image for the group's third EP, Hide and Seek, which was released on June 18, 2020. It consists of five songs, including the title track "Oopsy" and the previously released single "Dazzle Dazzle".

On October 8, Weki Meki released their fourth EP, New Rules, featuring five songs, including the title track "Cool" and its English version "100 Facts", which is their first song in English.

On November 18, 2021, Weki Meki released their fifth EP, I Am Me., featuring six songs, including the title track "Siesta".

Members

 Suyeon — leader 
 Elly
 Yoojung
 Doyeon
 Sei
 Lua
 Rina
 Lucy

Discography

Extended plays

Single albums

Reissues

Singles

Promotional singles

Collaborations

Soundtrack appearances

Compilation appearances

Videography

Music videos

Filmography

Reality shows

Dramas

Awards and nominations

Brand Awards

|-
| 2017
| rowspan="2"| Weki Meki
| Most Anticipated Female Artist – 2018
| 
|-
| 2018
| Most Anticipated Rising Star – 2019
|

Gaon Chart Music Awards

|-
| 2018
| Weki Meki
| New Artist of the Year (Album)
|

Golden Disc Awards

|-
| rowspan="3"| 2018
| Weme
| Disc Daesang
| 
|-
| rowspan="2"| Weki Meki 
| New Artist of the Year
| 
|-
| Global Popularity Award
|

Korean Culture Entertainment Awards

|-
| 2018
| rowspan="2"| Weki Meki
| K-Pop Singer Award
| 
|-
| 2020
| K-Pop Artist Award
| 
|}

Melon Music Awards

|-
| 2017
| Weki Meki
| Best New Artist
|

Mnet Asian Music Awards

|-
| rowspan="2"| 2017
| rowspan="2"| Weki Meki
| Qoo10 Artist of the Year
| 
|-
| Best New Female Artist
|

Seoul Music Awards

|-
| rowspan="3"|2018
| rowspan="4"|Weki Meki
| New Artist Award
| 
|-
| Popularity Award
| 
|-
| Hallyu Special Award
| 
|-
| 2022
| U+Idol Live Best Artist Award
|

Soribada Best K-Music Awards

|-
| 2019
| Weki Meki
| Art-tainer Award
|

Notes

References

External links
  on Fantagio 

K-pop music groups
Musical groups established in 2017
South Korean girl groups
2017 establishments in South Korea
Weki Meki
Fantagio artists